Victoria Street may refer to:

Streets

Australia
 Victoria Street, East Sydney
 Victoria Street railway station, New South Wales
 Victoria Street, Melbourne, Victoria
 Victoria Street railway station, Perth

Canada
 Victoria Street, Kitchener, Ontario
 Victoria Street, Toronto, Ontario; see Kitchener station
 Victoria Street, Kamloops, BC
 Victoria Street, Osgoode, Ontario (Ottawa Road 6)

Malaysia
 Victoria Street, Penang; a street in George Town, Penang

New Zealand
 Victoria Street, Auckland
 Victoria Street, Christchurch

Singapore
 Victoria Street, Singapore

United Kingdom
 Victoria Street, Bristol, England; see 
 Victoria Street, Edinburgh, Scotland
 Victoria Street, Liverpool, England
 Victoria Street, London, England
 Victoria Street, Wolverhampton, England

United States
 Victoria Street, Carson, California

Other uses
One of several adjacent streets connecting to Coronation Street on the television series of the same name

See also
List of places named after Queen Victoria
 Queen Victoria Street (disambiguation)
 Victoria (disambiguation)
 Victoria Avenue (disambiguation)